A novelty item or simply novelty is an object which is specifically designed to serve no practical purpose, and is sold for its uniqueness, humor, or simply as something new (hence "novelty", or newness). The term also applies to practical items with fanciful or nonfunctional additions, such as novelty aprons, slippers, or toilet paper. The term is normally applied to small objects, and is generally not used to describe larger items such as roadside attractions. Items may have an advertising or promotional purpose, or be a souvenir.

Usage
This term covers a range of small manufactured goods, such as  collectables, gadgets and executive toys. Novelty items are generally devices that do not primarily have a practical function. Toys for adults are often classed as novelties. Some products have a brief period as a novelty item when they are actually new, only to become an established, commonly used product, such as the Hula Hoop or the Frisbee.

Others may have an educational element, such as a Crookes radiometer, Newton's cradle, or drinking bird.  Sex toys are often described as novelty items (varying from this definition, as they do serve a practical purpose), and some products sold in sex shops may not have any practical sexual function, if operating primarily as a humorous gift, such as sex dice. Some food products may be considered novelty items, especially when first introduced, such as deep-fried Mars bars.

History 

The French mathematician and astronomer Pierre Hérigone (1580–1643) describes a novelty item that was a camera obscura in the form of a goblet.   Hérigone's device was constructed so that the user could spy on others while taking a drink.  Its 45-degree mirror had a stylized opening for the lens and the lid bore a magnifying lens at the top.

Lenticular printing was developed in the 1940s, and is used extensively in the production of novelty items. Paper clothing, which has some practical purpose, was briefly novel in the United States in the 1960s.

One of the more popular novelty items in recent history was the singing Big Mouth Billy Bass, manufactured by Gemmy Industries. It is estimated that over 20 million original pieces were sold in 12 months during 2000 and 2001.

Novelty items based on mathematical objects, such as Klein bottles and Penrose triangles, have been manufactured.  Models of Möbius strips are sometimes made in place of regular bands, such as rings.

List of novelty items

 Big Mouth Billy Bass
 Bobblehead
 Bubble pipe
 BunaB
 Chattering teeth
 Cheesehead
 Chinese finger trap
 Crookes radiometer
 Deely bobber
 Drinking bird
 Dehydrated water
 Expandable water toy
 Garden gnome
 Groucho glasses
 Horse head mask
 Joy buzzer 
 Kit-Cat Klock
 Lava lamp
 Magic 8-Ball
 Mexican jumping bean
 New Year's glasses
 Newton's cradle
 Novelty lighter
 Pet Rock
 Plasma globe
 Plastic flamingo
 Propeller beanie
 Radio hat, while a practical item, was a novelty when it first appeared
 Silly Putty
 Slime
 Slinky
 Snow globe
 Squirmle
 Talking clock
 Toffee hammer
 Trammel of Archimedes
 Umbrella hat
 Useless machine
 Viking helmets
 Whoopee cushion
 X-Ray specs

See also 
Bric-à-brac
Chindōgu, Japanese neologism for an "unuseless" invention
Ephemera
Notion (accessory)
Practical joke device
Souvenir

Further reading
Mark Newgarden, Cheap Laffs: The Art of the Novelty Item, Abrams Books/PictureBox, 2004.

 
Society-related lists